Betania is a corregimiento within Panama City, in Panamá District, Panamá Province, Panama with a population of 46,116 as of 2010. Its population as of 1990 was 46,611; its population as of 2000 was 44,409.

References

Corregimientos of Panamá Province
Panamá District